Qastal Ma'af is a town in northwestern Syria, administratively part of the Latakia Governorate, located north of Latakia. Nearby localities include Kesab to the north, Mashqita and Ayn al-Bayda to the south and Rabia to the east. According to the Syria Central Bureau of Statistics, Qastal Ma'af had a population of 585 in the 2004 census. It is the administrative center of the Qastal Ma'af nahiyah ("subdistrict"), which consisted of 19 localities with a collective population of 16,784 in 2004. The inhabitants of the town are predominantly Turkmen Sunni Muslim, and the inhabitants of the surrounding villages and subdistrict are predominantly Alawites.

References

Populated places in Latakia District
Towns in Syria
Turkmen communities in Syria